myPOS is a European payment services company, offering mobile payment terminals and online payments, based in London, UK.

History 
The idea of myPOS was conceived in 2012. Two years later, in 2014, myPOS was officially presented at the Mobile World Congress in Barcelona.

In 2017 the headquarters moved to London, UK. In September 2018, the company opened a store in Milan, Italy. In January 2022 the company has several stores across Europe:
 Amsterdam, Netherlands
 Antwerp, Belgium
 London, United Kingdom
 Milan,Italy
 Paris, France
 Sofia, Bulgaria
 Varna, Bulgaria
 Vienna, Austria
 Lisbon, Portugal
 Bucharest, Romania
 Iceland, Rekjavík

Products 
myPOS offers POS terminals and online payment solutions.

References 

Financial services companies of England
British companies established in 2014
Payment service providers